Prince Obed Mfanyana Dlamini (4 April 1937, in Mhlosheni – 18 January 2017 at Milpark Hospital) was Prime Minister of Swaziland from 12 July 1989 to 25 October 1993.

Career 
He was later a member of Liqoqo (king's advisory council), and was one of the two members in the council to have an affiliation to a political party. 

He was a member of the Ngwane National Liberatory Congress. Dlamini was also a member of parliament where he represented the Nhlambeni constituency in the Manzini region.

References

Members of the House of Assembly of Eswatini
Prime Ministers of Eswatini
Ngwane National Liberatory Congress politicians
1937 births
2017 deaths